Strymon istapa the mallow hairstreak, mallow-scrub hairstreak, dotted hairstreak or Hewitson's hairstreak. This diurnal butterfly is a widespread species that can be found in xeric habitats throughout the southern United States, Central America, parts of the Caribbean (including Cuba and Grand Cayman), and rarely in South America. This species can be spotted in rural and suburban areas in which human infringement has created open fields or tracks of overgrown weeds as a result of land clearing. These butterflies are often seen rubbing their hindwings together presumably to attract attention to their antenna mimicry scales located on the outer margin of the hindwing.

References

istapa
Butterflies of North America
Butterflies of Central America
Butterflies of the Caribbean
Butterflies of Cuba
Butterflies of Jamaica
Butterflies described in 1867